The following article presents a summary of the 2021 football (soccer) season in Brazil, which was the 120th season of competitive football in the country.

Campeonato Brasileiro Série A

The 2021 Campeonato Brasileiro Série A started on 29 May 2021 and ended on 9 December 2021.

América Mineiro
Athletico Paranaense
Atlético Goianiense
Atlético Mineiro
Bahia
Ceará
Chapecoense
Corinthians
Cuiabá
Flamengo
Fluminense
Fortaleza
Grêmio
Internacional
Juventude
Palmeiras
Red Bull Bragantino
Santos
São Paulo
Sport

Atlético Mineiro won the league.

Relegation
The four worst placed teams, Grêmio, Bahia, Sport and Chapecoense, were relegated to the following year's second level.

Campeonato Brasileiro Série B

The 2021 Campeonato Brasileiro Série B started on 28 May 2021 and ended on 28 November 2021.

Avaí
Botafogo
Brasil de Pelotas
Brusque
Confiança
Coritiba
CRB
Cruzeiro
CSA
Goiás
Guarani
Londrina
Náutico
Operário Ferroviário
Ponte Preta
Remo
Sampaio Corrêa
Vasco da Gama
Vila Nova
Vitória

Botafogo won the league.

Promotion
The four best placed teams, Botafogo, Coritiba, Goiás and Avaí, were promoted to the following year's first level.

Relegation
The four worst placed teams, Remo, Vitória, Confiança and Brasil de Pelotas, were relegated to the following year's third level.

Campeonato Brasileiro Série C

The 2021 Campeonato Brasileiro Série C started on 29 May 2021 and ended on 20 November 2021.

Altos
Botafogo (PB)
Botafogo (SP)
Criciúma
Ferroviário
Figueirense
Floresta
Ituano
Jacuipense
Manaus
Mirassol
Novorizontino
Oeste
Paraná
Paysandu
Santa Cruz
São José
Tombense
Volta Redonda
Ypiranga

The Campeonato Brasileiro Série C final was played between Ituano and Tombense.

Ituano won the league after beating Tombense.

Promotion
The four best placed teams, Tombense, Ituano, Criciúma and Novorizontino, were promoted to the following year's second level.

Relegation
The four worst placed teams, Jacuipense, Paraná, Santa Cruz and Oeste, were relegated to the following year's fourth level.

Campeonato Brasileiro Série D

The 2021 Campeonato Brasileiro Série D started on 26 May 2021 and ended on 13 November 2021.

4 de Julho
ABC
Águia Negra
Aimoré
América de Natal
Aparecidense
Aquidauanense
ASA
Atlético Acreano
Atlético Cearense
Atlético de Alagoinhas
Bahia de Feira
Bangu
Boa Esporte
Boavista
Brasiliense
Caldense
Campinense
FC Cascavel
Castanhal
Caucaia
Caxias
Central
Cianorte
Esportivo
Fast Clube
Ferroviária
Galvez
Gama
GAS
Goianésia
Guarany de Sobral
Imperatriz
Inter de Limeira
Itabaiana
Jaraguá
Joinville
Juazeirense
Juventude Samas
Juventus
Madureira
Marcílio Dias
Moto Club
Murici
Nova Mutum
Palmas
Paragominas
Patrocinense
Penarol
Picos
Porto Velho
Portuguesa (SP)
Real Ariquemes
Retrô
Rio Branco (ES)
Rio Branco (PR)
Rio Branco de Venda Nova
Santana
Santo André
São Bento
São Raimundo (RR)
Sergipe
Sousa
Tocantinópolis
Treze
Uberlândia
União Rondonópolis
Ypiranga (AP)

The Campeonato Brasileiro Série D final was played between Aparecidense and Campinense.

Aparecidense won the league after defeating Campinense.

Promotion 
The four best placed teams, Aparecidense, Campinense, ABC and Atlético Cearense, were promoted to the following year's third level.

Super cup

Supercopa do Brasil

The 2021 Supercopa do Brasil was played on 11 April 2021 between Flamengo and Palmeiras.

Flamengo won the super cup after defeating Palmeiras.

Domestic cups

Copa do Brasil

The 2021 Copa do Brasil started on 9 March 2021 and ended on 15 December 2021. The Copa do Brasil final was played between Athletico Paranaense and Atlético Mineiro.

Atlético Mineiro won the cup after defeating Athletico Paranaense.

Copa do Nordeste

The competition featured 16 clubs from the Northeastern region. It started on 27 February 2021 and ended on 8 May 2021. The Copa do Nordeste final was played between Bahia and Ceará.

Bahia won the cup after defeating Ceará.

Copa Verde

The competition featured 24 clubs from the North and Central-West regions, including two teams from Espírito Santo. It started on 13 October 2021 and ended on 11 December 2021. The Copa Verde final was played between Vila Nova and Remo.

Remo won the cup after defeating Vila Nova.

State championship champions

State cup competition champions

Youth competition champions

(1) The Copa Nacional do Espírito Santo Sub-17, between 2008 and 2012, was named Copa Brasil Sub-17. The similar named Copa do Brasil Sub-17 is organized by the Brazilian Football Confederation and it was first played in 2013.

Brazilian clubs in international competitions

National team
The following table lists all the games played by the Brazilian national team in official competitions and friendly matches during 2021.

FIFA World Cup qualification

1. The match was suspended after Anvisa stopped it after 5 minutes at 0–0 accusing four Argentine players of violating the COVID quarantine rules. On 14 February 2022, FIFA annulled the match being initially rescheduled to September 2022 at a location to be defined by the CBF. Finally the match was cancelled by FIFA on 16 August 2022.

Copa América

Women's football

Campeonato Brasileiro de Futebol Feminino Série A1

The 2021 Campeonato Brasileiro de Futebol Feminino Série A1 started on 17 April 2021 and ended on 26 September 2021.

Bahia
Botafogo
Corinthians
Cruzeiro
Ferroviária
Flamengo/Marinha
Grêmio
Internacional
Kindermann/Avaí
Minas/ICESP
Napoli
Palmeiras
Real Brasília
Santos
São José
São Paulo

The Campeonato Brasileiro de Futebol Feminino Série A1 final was played between Corinthians and Palmeiras.

Corinthians won the league after defeating Palmeiras.

Relegation
The four worst placed teams, Botafogo, Minas/ICESP, Napoli and Bahia, were relegated to the following year's second level.

Campeonato Brasileiro de Futebol Feminino Série A2

The 2021 Campeonato Brasileiro de Futebol Feminino Série A2 started on 15 May 2021 and ended on 7 September 2021.

Aliança
América de Natal
América Mineiro
Assermurb
Athletico Paranaense
Atlético Goianiense
Atlético Mineiro
Botafogo (PB)
Brasil de Farroupilha
Ceará
CEFAMA
Chapecoense
CRESSPOM
Criciúma
ESMAC
Fluminense
Fortaleza
Iranduba
JC
Juventude (BA)
Mixto
Náutico
Oratório
Paraíso
Ponte Preta
Real Ariquemes
Red Bull Bragantino
Santos Dumont
São Raimundo (RR)
SERC/UCDB
Sport
Tiradentes
UDA
Vasco da Gama
Vila Nova (ES)
Vitória

The Campeonato Brasileiro de Futebol Feminino Série A2 final was played between Red Bull Bragantino and Atlético Mineiro.

Red Bull Bragantino won the league after defeating Atlético Mineiro.

Promotion
The four best placed teams, Red Bull Bragantino, Atlético Mineiro, ESMAC and CRESSPOM, were promoted to the following year's first level.

Domestic competition champions

State cup competition champions

Youth competition champions

Brazilian clubs in international competitions

National team
The following table lists all the games played by the Brazil women's national football team in official competitions and friendly matches during 2021.

The Brazil women's national football team competed in the following competitions in 2021:

Friendlies

2021 SheBelieves Cup

2020 Summer Olympics

2021 International Women's Football Tournament

References

External links
 Brazilian competitions at RSSSF

 
Seasons in Brazilian football